Paik's Mysterious Kitchen is a South Korean show. It airs on SBS., following Baek Jong-won's Top 3 Chef King and Baek Jong-won's Food Truck after the Baek Jong-won's Alley Restaurant, the fourth part of the Baek Jong-won series. The programs were broadcast on May 18 and 25, 2019.

Broadcast time

Format 
Mysterious Kitchen is a new cooking show featuring elements of mystery. Each week, two mysterious chefs cook their own signature dish in four-walled kitchens. Baek Jong-won, the famous businessman and food expert, and Kim Hee-chul, a K-pop star/food enthusiast, guess who the chef is based on various clues: how to understand ingredients, what technique they use, how to handle the fire, etc. Then, five culinary experts taste the finished dishes and vote for the winner. The show will entertain you by showing the masterful culinary skills, providing a vicarious satisfaction on delicious food, and making you solve the mystery. Plus, you can get the recipe for the winning dish.

Program list

References

2019 South Korean television series debuts
Korean-language television shows
2019 South Korean television series endings